Victoria is a city in Ellis County, Kansas, United States.  As of the 2020 census, the population of the city was 1,129.

History

A group of British colonists led by a Scotsman named George Grant founded Victoria in 1873 on land he had purchased from the Kansas Pacific Railway. They named the settlement after Queen Victoria. Grant intended for Victoria to be a ranching community and was purportedly responsible for bringing the first Aberdeen Angus cattle to the United States. Most of the colonists, however, were remittance men more interested in sports and dancing than in raising livestock. Their families soon learned of this and reduced the remittances, driving most of the colonists to leave by 1880. Some returned to Britain; others left for South America.

In 1876, Volga Germans from villages near Saratov, Russia established the settlement of Herzog one half mile north of Victoria. Herzog's Roman Catholic settlers built a series of churches which culminated in the construction of St. Fidelis Catholic Church, known as "The Cathedral of the Plains," in 1911. Herzog grew rapidly and later absorbed Victoria, eventually adopting the older settlement's name. Herzog was officially renamed Victoria in 1913.

In 1942, the U.S. Army built Walker Army Airfield 3 miles northeast of Victoria. During World War II, thousands were stationed at the airfield, most for training in operation of the Boeing B-29 Superfortress bomber aircraft. The military closed the base in 1946.

In 1966, construction of Interstate 70 reached Victoria, passing north of the city.

Geography
Victoria is located at  (38.853588, -99.147456) at an elevation of 1,926 feet (587 m).

The city sits on the east side of the North Fork of Big Creek, part of the Smoky Hill River watershed.

Demographics

2010 census
As of the 2010 United States Census, there were 1,214 people, 496 households, and 316 families residing in the city. The racial makeup of the city was 98.5% White, 0.3% American Indian, 0.2% African American, 0.1% from some other race, and 0.8% from two or more races. Hispanics and Latinos of any race were 0.5% of the population.

There were 496 households, of which 29.6% had children under the age of 18 living with them, 53.4% were married couples living together, 3.8% had a male householder with no wife present, 6.5% had a female householder with no husband present, and 36.3% were non-families. 33.1% of all households were made up of individuals, and 15.7% had someone living alone who was 65 years of age or older. The average household size was 2.30, and the average family size was 2.93.

The median age in the city was 41.7 years. 22.3% of residents were under the age of 18; 6.8% were between the ages of 18 and 24; 24.8% were from 25 to 44; 24.6% were from 45 to 64; and 21.3% were 65 years of age or older. The gender makeup of the city was 50.9% male and 49.1% female.

The median income for a household in the city was $46,125, and the median income for a family was $64,000. Males had a median income of $35,875 versus $26,058 for females. The per capita income for the city was $22,636. About 3.2% of families and 4.1% of the population were below the poverty line, including 5.4% of those under age 18 and 6.6% of those age 65 or over.

Economy
As of 2012, 61.5% of the population over the age of 16 was in the labor force. 0.0% was in the armed forces, and 61.5% was in the civilian labor force with 59.7% being employed and 1.8% unemployed. The composition, by occupation, of the employed civilian labor force was:  26.7% in management, business, science, and arts; 26.2% in sales and office occupations; 17.0% in production, transportation, and material moving; 15.9% in natural resources, construction, and maintenance; and 14.2% in service occupations. The three industries employing the largest percentages of the working civilian labor force were:  educational services, and health care and social assistance (24.1%); agriculture, forestry, fishing and hunting, and mining (10.7%); and Wholesale trade (8.2%).

The cost of living in Victoria is relatively low; compared to a U.S. average of 100, the cost of living index for the community is 81.5. As of 2012, the median home value in the city was $101,200, the median selected monthly owner cost was $1,042 for housing units with a mortgage and $428 for those without, and the median gross rent was $555.

Government
Victoria is a city of the third class with a mayor-council form of government. The city council consists of five members, and it meets on the third Monday of each month.

Victoria lies within Kansas's 1st U.S. Congressional District. For the purposes of representation in the Kansas Legislature, the city is located in the 40th district of the Kansas Senate and the 111th district of the Kansas House of Representatives.

Education

Primary and secondary education
Unified School District (USD) 432 is based in Victoria and operates two public schools in the city:
 Victoria Grade School (Grades Pre-K-6)
 Victoria High School (7-12)

Infrastructure

Transportation
Interstate 70 and U.S. Route 40 run concurrently east-west roughly one mile north of Victoria. K-255 runs north–south from I-70 to Victoria's northern city limits.

The Kansas Pacific (KP) line of the Union Pacific Railroad runs northeast–southwest through the southern part of the city.

Utilities
Water distribution, sewer maintenance, and trash removal are the responsibility of the city government. Midwest Energy, Inc. provides electric power. Local residents primarily use natural gas for heating fuel; service is provided by Kansas Gas Service.

Media
Victoria is in the Wichita-Hutchinson, Kansas television market.

Culture

Events
The Herzogfest is Victoria's annual community festival, held to celebrate the city's ethnic German heritage.  Held in August, it includes music concerts, a tractor pull, games for children, and other local entertainment.  There is delicious food from the German heritage and other vendors.

Points of interest
The Basilica of St. Fidelis, known as "The Cathedral of the Plains", is located in Victoria. Local Roman Catholic residents, having outgrown a series of church buildings as their population grew, began construction of the church in 1908. Built from native limestone based on plans by noted church architect John T. Comes, St. Fidelis Catholic Church was completed in 1911. William Jennings Bryan gave the church its nickname during a visit in 1912. In June 2014, the Roman Catholic Diocese of Salina dedicated the church as a minor basilica, renaming it the Basilica of St. Fidelis.

Notable people
Notable individuals who were born in and/or have lived in Victoria include:
Monty Beisel (1978- ), football linebacker
Lucy Isabella Buckstone (1857-1893), actress
Nate Dreiling (1990- ), football linebacker
James "Scotty" Philip (1858-1911), American bison rancher
Theodore McCarrick, laicized American cardinal of the Catholic Church and former Archbishop of Washington, D.C.

Sister cities
 Kubelstein, Scheßlitz, Germany

See also
 Walker Army Airfield, an abandoned World War II airfield.

References

Further reading

External links

 City of Victoria
 Victoria - Directory of Public Officials
 USD 432, local school district
 Saint Fidelis Catholic Church "Cathedral of the Plains", photos.
 Historic Images of Victoria, Special Photo Collections at Wichita State University Library
 Victoria city map, KDOT

Cities in Kansas
Cities in Ellis County, Kansas
Populated places established in 1873
1873 establishments in Kansas